The Leninsky Komsomol class (also transliterated as Leninskiy Komsomol or Leninskij Komsomol (Russian: Ленинский Комсомол класс) was a class of 25 ocean-going dry cargo ships; tweendeckers with turbine main engines, built between 1959 and 1968 in the Soviet Union under the designations Projects 567 and 567K. Twenty were built by the Kherson Shipyard, and five in either the Nikolayev Shipyard, or the Nosenko Shipyard in Nikolayev. They were part of a program to modernize the Soviet Union's merchant fleet.

Three forms of transliteration of the Russian name are used in English-language sources: 
 Leninsky Komsomol – the official registered English name of the first ship of this class, used as the name of the class of as a whole.
 Leninskiy Komsomol – an alternative transliteration sometimes used in press or literature after 1975. It is also the official registered English name of a river vessel built after 1975.
 Leninskij Komsomol – an alternative transliteration.

The Leninsky Komsomol-class ships were the first merchant ships of the Soviet Union to have turbine engines. They were called "turbo-runners" in news reports and by seamen.

The class was named after the lead ship, the Leninsky Komsomol. This first vessel was laid on 25 September 1957 and was handed over to Black Sea Shipping Company on 23 December 1959. The last ship in the class was named Parizhskaya Kommuna (Russian: Парижская Коммуна) which was taken into operation on 17 December 1968. This was the third largest class of ship in Black Sea Shipping Company by number of ships in the class. The Parizhskaya Kommuna was the first Soviet merchant ship with controllable pitch propeller and the largest ship with gas-turbine main engines in the world at the time of her launching.

The Leninsky Komsomol-class ships were excellent for transatlantic traffic. Their speed, manoeuvrability and seaworthiness forced foreign experts to pay attention to the design. The ships had high freeboard and, because of this, excellent stability and seaworthiness.

Development and operational history

Project 567 was developed at the Central Design Bureau Chernomorsudoproekt (CDB ChSP) in Nikolayev. The main designers were K. I. Bohonevich, B. K. Sidorov  and F. V. Sibir'.

Ships of this class were designed for use:
 as merchant ships during peacetime;
 as "blockade runners" in case of a blockade of friendly states;
 as fast troop transports in wartime, after their mobilization, arming and commissioning in the Soviet Navy

The Leninsky Komsomol-class cargo ships were a continuation of a tradition already established in Russian and Soviet shipbuilding. Ships built with a dual purpose in Russia dated back to the age of sailing ships and the paddle steamer fleet. Russia had been defeated in the Crimean War of 1853–1856, and the terms of the resulting Treaty of Paris prohibited Russia from maintaining a naval force in the Black Sea. This led to the practice of building merchant ships with extra strength and speed that operated under the flags of the Russian Steam Navigation and Trading Company (ROPIT), the Voluntary Fleet (Dobroflot), and other shipping companies of the Russian Empire during peacetime. These vessels could be quickly mobilised for military duty in wartime, with 200 merchant ships mobilised for service with the Imperial Russian Navy after the outbreak of the First World War in just the Black Sea.

During the Soviet period shipbuilders built several types of high-speed (for that time) ocean-going cargo ships with dual-purpose-use. The Leninsky Komsomol class had a deadweight of 16 thousand tons, with six holds and six tweendecks, with cabins for one or two crewmembers each. They were built in Nikolayev and Kherson. A ship class is often called by the name of the first ship of the class to be launched or delivered. In this instance the first ship was named Leninsky Komsomol. This was most likely due to the influence of the KGB, which had a strong interest in building such ships and was led consistently by former Komsomol leaders, such as Alexander Shelepin and Vladimir Semichastny. The phenomenon of former Komsomol workers working in the KGB was termed , and included Vladimir Semichastny,  and others.

The Leninsky Komsomol class demonstrated the expertise of the Soviet Black Sea shipbuilders and the increased level of the Soviet shipbuilding industry. All of the class were initially operated by the Black Sea Shipping Company, homeported in Odessa. By the early 1980s the Black Sea Shipping Company included 270 ocean-going ships, and was ranked as the world's largest shipping company by number of vessels, due to the construction of ships in the 1960s and 1970s. Three Leninsky Komsomol class cargo ships were transferred to the Soviet Navy in 1985–1986 for use as large dry-cargo transports:
 Ravenstvo was transferred in 1985.
 Akademik Szymanskiy and Leninsky Pioner were transferred in 1986.

Use in military transportation

Leninsky Komsomol-class ships were used as a "blockade runners" during "Operation Anadyr", the Soviet effort to break the Cuba blockade during the Cuban Missile Crisis. 57 ships of the Black Sea Shipping Company were involved in breaking the blockade. An additional 34 vessels from Baltic Shipping Company, the Murmansk Shipping Company, the Latvian Shipping Company and the Far Eastern Shipping Company also participated. Leninsky Komsomol-class ships were later used to carry military cargo to Angola, Vietnam and other countries in conflict zones during the Cold War.

During the 1973 Arab-Israeli War, eight Soviet Leninsky Komsomol-class ships carried military cargoes to Syria and Egypt in October and early November 1973:
 Leninsky Komsomol - arrived in Alexandria on 28 October 1973.
 Fizik Kurchatov - visited Alexandria twice and Latakia once.
 Bratstvo - arrived in Latakia on 20 October 1973.
 Khimik Zelinskiy
 Krasnyy Oktyabr
 Leninsky Pioner
 Yunyi Leninets
 Parizhskaya Kommuna

Other classes of merchant ship carried military cargoes to Syria and Egypt during this period, but more Leninsky Komsomol-class ships were involved in these operations than any other class of Soviet merchant ship.

Design
Project 567 was developed at the Central Design Bureau Chernomorsudoproekt (CDB ChSP) in Nikolayev.
Major designers:
 K. I. Bohonevich (until 1956)
 B. K. Sidorov (1956–1961)
 F. V. Sibir' (from 1961)

A total of 25 ships were built. Twenty of the ships were built at the Kherson Shipyard and a further five at the Nikolayev Shipyard, or the Nosenko Shipyard in Nikolayev under the Soviet merchant fleet modernization program. The first ship was laid down in 1957 and was completed and handed over in December 1959. The last ship was completed and handed over in 1968.

Outwardly the Leninsky Komsomol-class resembled the US Mariner class, with their cargo derricks and their superstructure divided into three structures (a long forecastle, central accommodation structure, and aftcastle), the engine room in the centre, a sloping bow, and a cruiser stern. The Leninsky Komsomol-class ships were roughly the same length as the American vessels, but were less broad beamed.

The ships were classed as multipurpose tweendeckers and as dry cargo freighters. All were powered by steam-turbines, with the exception of the gas-turbine-powered SS Parizhskaya Communa. They had two decks in the tweendecker style, and their superstructure in three blocks. Their general purpose was the carriage of general and grain cargoes.

Specifications
The dimensions and tonnage of each ship varied slightly from her sisters, but shape of the hull and the proportions were the same. A new and improved hull design was developed for the Leninsky Komsomol class. The design proved successful and was used in the construction of later classes of Soviet merchant ships. including those of the Slavyansk and  Kapitany classes. Some variations in the later designs included the placing of the superstructure closer to the stern, and reducing the number of hold compartments to five larger ones. The design was continually refined and improved as the ships were being built, using lessons learned from preceding ships. The cargo booms used on the earlier ships were replaced with brand new Soviet-made cargo cranes on those built after 1961. But generally the overall design remained the same.

Engines for all ships in the Leninsky Komsomol series were made at the Kirov Plant in Leningrad and installed at the Kherson and Nikolayev shipyards. All, with the exception of the last to be built, Parizhskaya Kommuna, were equipped with a "ТС-1" steam turbine turbo gear unit consisting of a double-case turbine and gears fed by two fuel oil boilers with capacity of 25 tons of steam per hour at a pressure of 42 atmospheres and a temperature of 470 °C. Turbine power was 13 000 hp, giving 1000 rpm at full speed. The gearbox lowered this to 100 rpm in the transition to a single four-bladed bronze propeller with a diameter of 6.3 m. The processes managing the boilers and turbine were automated. The Parizhskaya Communa, completed in 1968, was equipped with a "ГТУ-20" gas turbine from the Kirov Plant.This provided 13,000 hp and allowed Parizhskaya Communa to reach a speed of 19 knots. At that time she was the largest merchant freighter with gas turbine engine in the world. Generally the power output for ships of the class was between 13000 and 14300 hp. Leninsky Komsomol attained a speed of 18.2 knots. The maximum speed of other ships in the class while carrying cargo was 19.2 knots, rising to 20.4 knots when sailing in ballast. This made the Leninsky Komsomol ships faster than most contemporary merchant ships. They had a cruising range of some 12,000 miles.

There were frequent turbine breakdowns while sailing at high speed. If one turbine blade was damaged while at full speed the ship lurched with such force that people on the deck fell and people working at height risked falling and being injured. The heightened fuel consumption at high speed in the face of rising fuel prices made the operation of the ship too expensive. Careful attention was paid to the different speed gradations used in service:
 Maximum speed – the speed recorded on tests after delivery into service, which a ship could reach in case of emergency (such as escaping pursuit; or arriving at a destination port on schedule);
 Operational speed – the speed at which the ship's engines did not receive damage;
 Economic speed – speed that is profitable from an economic point of view and taking into account the prevention of damage to the engine room.

Cargo operations

The Leninsky Komsomol-class ships had six cargo holds, providing a total bale capacity of 19,925m³ and a bulk capacity of 23,355m³.

Four of the class, including the Metallurg Anosov, were specially equipped for the transportation of troops and weapons, including long-range missiles. The Metallurg Anosovs length overall was 9.1 m longer than the Leninsky Komsomol, the first ship in the class. The beam, moulded depth and size of cargo hatches were also increased.

The Leninsky Komsomol-class ships were equipped with either cargo derricks, used on the first four ships built, or cargo cranes, used on every Leninsky Komsomol-class ship built from 1961 onwards.

The first configuration used was for a ship equipped with cargo booms (cargo derricks) and two heavy-lift derricks:
 16 cargo derricks lifting 5.0 metric tons. Holds No.1 and No.6 were serviced by two derricks each, the other holds by four derricks each. Holds number 3 and 4 had two derricks lifting 5 metric tons and two derricks lifting 10 metric tons . The other four cargo derricks lifted 10.0 metric tons each.
 The automated derricks were equipped with winches and managed by one person, which could work with two combined derricks.
 Two heavy lift derricks capable of lifting 60.0 metric tons each. These derricks were operated by two people, with two control columns installed on the mast of each derrick.
 Five masts: four of them in an inverted v-shaped construction to carry cargo derricks lifting 5 metric tons each, and an additional one on the accommodation superstructure in the center of the vessel.
 Two pairs of cargo gear columns carrying cargo derricks lifting 10 metric tons.

The second configuration was for cargo cranes and two heavy-lift derricks:
 Twelve electric cargo cranes of type "КЭ-26" with a carrying capacity of 5.0 metric tons, two cranes serving each hold.
 Two heavy derricks with a capacity of 60.0 tons each.
 Three masts: one on the accommodation superstructure in the center of the vessel and two carrying two heavy-lift derricks.

Self-defense
In the event of military mobilization Leninsky Komsomol-class ships could be fitted with anti-aircraft guns installed on rotary mounts in place of the cargo cranes. The comparatively high speed that the ships could attain would have allowed them to outrun some pursuers, or to escape dangerous areas quickly.

Crew 
The first vessels had berths for 51 people, including 10 spare beds, though the last vessels to be introduced had berths for 48 persons or fewer. The Soviet shipping companies began reducing the crews of merchant ships in the late 1960s, a process which continued into the 1990s. During the last years of their operation, the Leninsky Komsomol-class ships were crewed by around 35 people, nearly half that had originally been necessary. Cabins were initially for single, double or four-person occupancy, and by the 1970s the four-berth cabins had been converted into double berths. The ships were fitted with Soviet-made air-conditioning.

List of ships

Ship specifications

Significance

Michael Yakovich Kozubenko, a cinematographer working at Odessa Film Studio from 1953 produced the 1959 documentary film "Leninsky Komsomol class turbo-runners". The class were held up as examples of the latest in Soviet shipping construction, and used in promotional advertisements in 1963/1964 for the USSR Maritime Transport, depicting the Leninsky Komsomol-class ships built in the shipyards of the Ukrainian SSR, and the tanker Sofia, which had been built in a Leningrad shipyard. The Leninsky Komsomol-class ships also received wide coverage in newspaper and magazine articles. The class was a particularly significant milestone in the shipbuilding history of U.S.S.R., and Kherson Shipyard in particular. They were somewhat less so for Nikolayev Shipyard, as only five were built there, and the yard was already well known for the construction of naval vessels.

In 2009 the Marshall Islands issued a series of stamps dedicated to the Cuban Missile Crisis. One depicted a Leninsky Komsomol-class ship, described as the  Metallurg Kurako, surrounded by warships and patrol aircraft of the US Navy. The depiction is similar to a photograph of the Metallurg Anosov, and it may be that it is the Metallurg Anosov pictured on this stamp.

See also

Notes

a.  All ships were handed over to the Black Sea Shipping Company on the date of their completion, with the exception of Parishskaya Kommuna, which was delivered to the company after an extended period of sea trials.

b.  The dates of the scrapping of Leninsky Pioner and her removal from Lloyd's Register are different. Leninsky Pioner was transferred from Black Sea Shipping Company to the Soviet Navy's Black Sea Fleet in 1986. A new container ship also named Leninsky Pioner was laid down on 23 January 1987. It is not clear which vessel was removed from Lloyd's List in 1999.

References

 
Ships of Black Sea Shipping Company
Ships of the Soviet Union
Cuba–Soviet Union relations
Non-combat military operations involving the Soviet Union
Cuban Missile Crisis